ESFS may refer to:

 European System of Financial Supervision
 European Science Fiction Society

See also 
 ESF (disambiguation)